This is a complete list of Appalachian State Mountaineers head football coaches. Fielding its first organized football team in 1928, the Appalachian State Mountaineers have had 22 coaches. Flucie Stewart and E. C. Duggins have each served twice as head coach of the Mountaineers. Jerry Moore is the only three-time winner of the American Football Coaches Association (AFCA) Coach of the Year award. Moore also has the most Southern Conference Coach of the Year awards with seven. Scott Satterfield was named as Appalachian's 20th head coach on December 14, 2012. Shawn Clark serves as the 22nd and current head coach.

Key

Coaches

References
General

Specific

Lists of college football head coaches

North Carolina sports-related lists